The 1995–96 Rugby Football League season was the 101st season of rugby league football. Eleven English teams competed from August 1995 until January 1996 for the Stones Bitter Centenary Championship. The season was kept brief to accommodate the first season of the forthcoming new Super League competition, which would see top-level rugby league in the UK changed to a summer sport. It was also punctuated by the 1995 World Cup which took place in Britain throughout October. The 1996 Challenge Cup rounds started immediately after the Centenary Championship and the final was played in summer, during Super League I.

Season summary
Stones Bitter Centenary League Champions: Wigan (17th title)
Silk Cut Challenge Cup Winners: Final played in 1996 summer season.
Regal Trophy Winners: Wigan (8 - 25-16 v St Helens)
1st Division Champions: Salford
2nd Division Champions: Hull Kingston Rovers

Standings

Championship

The top ten teams from the previous season plus the London Broncos competed for the Stones Bitter Centenary League Championship. For the seventh consecutive season, Wigan were crowned League Champions after finishing the season on top of the ladder. No teams were promoted or relegated.

First Division

Second Division

Statistics
The following are the top points scorers in the 1995–96 season.

Most tries

Most goals (including drop goals)

References

Sources
1995–96 Rugby Football League season at rlhalloffame.org.uk
1995–96 Rugby Football League season at wigan.rlfans.com
Great Britain Competitions 1995-1996 at hunterlink.net.au
Championship 1995/96 at rugbyleagueproject.org

Rugby Football League seasons
Rugby Football League season
Rugby Football League season